Boyce Callahan (born  1942) is a former American football running back who played college football at Jacksonville State from 1970 to 1973. He rushed for 4,227 yards and 40 touchdowns. He was five-feet-seven inches and 155 pounds during his playing career. He was selected by the Associated Press as a second-team running back on the 1973 Little All-America college football team. Alabama Governor George Wallace proclaimed February 2, 1974, as "Boyce Callahan Day" in the State of Alabama. He was inducted into the Jacksonville State Athletic Hall of Fame in 1987. His jersey number 33 is one of two numbers that Jacksonville State has retired.

References

American football running backs
Jacksonville State Gamecocks football players
Players of American football from Alabama